Sierra Railway 28 is a 2-8-0 steam locomotive owned and operated by the Sierra Railway in California.

History
2-8-0 Consolidation number 28 was built in January 1922 for the Sierra Railway Company of California by the Baldwin Locomotive Works of Philadelphia, Pennsylvania. It was built in response to the increase of freight traffic on the Sierra with the construction of the Don Pedro and O'Shaughnessy Dams requiring carloads of rock and cement. After the dam projects were finished, the 28 was assigned to freight traffic on the Sierra's lower division between Oakdale and Jamestown, California.

In the mid 1930s, No. 28 also hauled mixed trains between Oakdale and Tuolumne until September 1st, 1938, when all scheduled rail passenger service on the Sierra Railway was discontinued.

By the 1940s, the 28 was one of only six remaining locomotives on the Sierra's roster and continued to handle freight and railfan excursions until 1955 when the Sierra purchased two diesel-electric locomotives to replace the steam engines in freight service. However, the Sierra retained the 28, along with 4-6-0 number 3, 2-8-0 number 18, 2-8-2 number 34 and 2-8-2 number 36 for occasional railfan trips and movie work. All railfan excursions ended on October 19th, 1963 after Sierra No. 28 derailed in the Jamestown yard during an excursion outing.

During this time, Sierra No. 28 made several appearances in movies and television shows, including Overland Trail, Nichols, Little House on the Prairie, Bound for Glory and The World's Greatest Lover.

In May 1971, the Sierra Railroad opened its historic railroad facilities at Jamestown to the public as a tourist attraction called Rail Town 1897. Sierra No. 28 became the workhorse of this new tourist operation. In 1979, Crocker & Associates, which owned the Sierra Railroad and Rail Town 1897, decided to sell the Jamestown complex and all of its historic rail equipment, including engine No. 28, to the State of California, which reorganized Rail Town 1897 as Railtown 1897 State Historic Park.

After the State of California took over Railtown's operations, 28 continued to serve as its primary excursion locomotive, operating seasonally from April through October. In early 2009, Sierra No. 28 was taken out of service after its crown sheet and other areas of the firebox were found to be too thin for continued operation. Sierra No. 28 remained stored in the Jamestown roundhouse awaiting restoration funds until August, 2013, when it was torn down for repairs to its firebox.

After being out of service for more than ten years, the 28 returned to operation on June 1st, 2019.

See also
 Sierra No. 3, a 4-6-0 also owned by Railtown 1897
 Polson Logging Co. 2

References

2-8-0 locomotives
Individual locomotives of the United States
Baldwin locomotives
Preserved steam locomotives of California
Railway locomotives introduced in 1922
Standard gauge locomotives of the United States